Denny Field may refer to:
 Denny Field (Alabama), a football playing field at the University of Alabama used from 1915 to 1929 
 Denny Field (Washington), an athletic field at the University of Washington, used for football from 1895 to 1920